is a railway station in Mihara, Hiroshima Prefecture, Japan.

Lines
West Japan Railway Company
 Kure Line

Buildings

Surrounding Area
 Imabari Shipbuilding  Hiroshima Shipyard
  National Route 185

Source

Railway stations in Hiroshima Prefecture
Railway stations in Japan opened in 1931